Lacey Baldwin Smith (1922 – September 8, 2013) was an historian and author specialising in 16th-century England. He was the author of Henry VIII: The Mask of Royalty and Catherine Howard: A Tudor Tragedy, among other books.

Born in Princeton, New Jersey, Smith taught at Princeton University, the Massachusetts Institute of Technology, and Northwestern University. He received two Fulbright awards, two National Endowment for the Humanities fellowships, a Guggenheim Fellowship, and other awards. He lived in Vermont during his retirement, dying at Greensboro.

He was elected a Fellow of the Royal Society of Literature in 1972.

Works
Tudor Prelates and Politics, 1536–1558 (Princeton Studies in History. vol. 8.) (1953)
Catherine Howard: A Tudor Tragedy
The Elizabethan Epic (1966)
The Horizon Book of the Elizabethan World (1966; Reprinted as The Elizabethan World, 1973)
Henry VIII: The Mask of Royalty (1973)
Elizabeth Tudor: Portrait of a Queen (1976)
Dimensions of the Holocaust - A series of lectures presented at Northwestern University and coordinated by the Department of History by Elie Wiesel and Lacey Baldwin Smith (1983)
Treason in Tudor England: Politics & Paranoia (1986)
Fools, Martyrs, Traitors: The Story of Martyrdom in the Western World (1997)
English History Made Brief, Irreverent and Pleasurable (2007)
This Realm of England 1399–1688
Anne Boleyn: The Queen of Controversy (2013)

References

1922 births
2013 deaths
American historians
Fellows of the Royal Society of Literature
Princeton University faculty
Massachusetts Institute of Technology faculty
Northwestern University alumni